Damien Richardson may refer to:

 Damien Richardson (footballer), Irish football manager and former player
 Damien Richardson (American football)
 Damien Richardson (actor), Australian actor